Mountain Studios was a commercial recording studio founded by American singer and composer Anita Kerr and husband Alex Grob in 1975 within the Montreux Casino in Montreux, Switzerland. The studio was under the ownership of Queen and then long-time Queen producer David Richards, from 1979 until 2013, after which it became the charity museum/exhibition Queen: The Studio Experience, benefitting the Mercury Phoenix Trust.

Background
Singer and composer Anita Kerr and her husband, Swiss businessman Alex Grob, hired Westlake Audio and studio designer Tom Hidley to build the studio in the Montreux Casino, where it recorded all live performances of the Montreux Jazz Festival. Additionally, the tax advantages of the studio's location in Switzerland proved popular, with British artists such as David Bowie, The Rolling Stones, Yes, Rick Wakeman, and Emerson, Lake & Palmer and Queen recording at Mountain Studios over the first few years.

In 1979, Queen acquired the studio from Kerr and Grob, and subsequently utilized the studio for several subsequent Queen albums, as well as solo projects from band members Freddie Mercury, Brian May, and Roger Taylor.

In 1993, long-time Queen producer, David Richards, bought the studio. Upon Richards' death in 2013, the location of the former studio became the charity museum/exhibition Queen: The Studio Experience, with the Mercury Phoenix Trust being the beneficiary.

Albums recorded at Mountain Studios
 Samael
 Eternal (1999)
 Queen
 Jazz (1978)
 Hot Space (1982)
 A Kind of Magic (1986)
 The Miracle (1989)
 Innuendo (1991)
 Made in Heaven (1995)
 Brian May
 Back to the Light (1992)
 Freddie Mercury & Montserrat Caballé
 Barcelona (1988)
 Roger Taylor
 Fun in Space (1981)
 Strange Frontier (1984)
 The Cross
 Shove It (1988)
 Mad, Bad and Dangerous to Know (1990)
 AC/DC
 Fly on the Wall (1985)
 David Bowie
 Lodger (1979)
 Never Let Me Down (1987)
 Black Tie White Noise (1993)
 The Buddha of Suburbia (1993)
 Outside (1995)
 Iggy Pop
 Blah Blah Blah (1986)
 Chris Rea
 Water Sign (1983)
 Wired to the Moon (1984)
 Shamrock Diaries (1985)
 On the Beach (1986)
 The Rolling Stones
 Black and Blue (1976)
 Yes
 Going for the One (1977)
 Rick Wakeman
 Rick Wakeman's Criminal Record (1977)
 Magnum
 Vigilante (1986)
 Smokie
 The Montreux Album (1978)
 Status Quo
 1+9+8+2 (1982)
 Emerson, Lake & Palmer
 Works Volume 1 (1977)
 Bluvertigo
 Zero - ovvero la famosa nevicata dell'85 (1999)
Christine McVie
Christine McVie(1984)

See also
David Richards

References

External links
 Official website
 http://www.mercuryphoenixtrust.com/studioexperience/
 https://www.montreuxcelebration.com/en-11-mountain-studios.html

Queen (band)
Recording studios in Switzerland